Nirbhayadeva was a Thakuri king of Nepal who reigned from .

Reign 
In around 1007, he was reduced to the status of a co-ruler by Rudradeva, and the next year, his reign ceased. Rudradeva and his nephew Bhojadeva ruled jointly after then. He died a few years later.

References

Bibliography 

 
 
 

Nepalese monarchs
History of Nepal
11th-century Nepalese people